Política Exterior is a bimonthly foreign affairs magazine published in Madrid, Spain. It has been in circulation since 1987. Its subtitle is Economía y Tecnología (Spanish: Economy and Technology).

History and profile
Política Exterior was established in 1987. The magazine is published by Estudios de Política Exterior, S.A. on a bimonthly basis. Darío Valcárcel is among the former editors of the magazine. As of September 2022 Aurea Molto is the editor. It covers articles on international relations and has its headquarters in Madrid.

See also
 List of magazines in Spain

References

External links

1987 establishments in Spain
Bi-monthly magazines published in Spain
Magazines established in 1987
Magazines published in Madrid
Political magazines published in Spain
Spanish-language magazines